Cliffe Hill Quarry is a  geological Site of Special Scientific Interest on the western outskirts of Markfield in Leicestershire. It is a Geological Conservation Review site.

This quarry exposes volcanic and sedimentary Charnian rocks dating to the Precambrian eon. It was probably then a volcanic island. An unusually homogeneous form of the rock diorite is sometimes called markfieldite because it is found in the village.

The site is private land with no public access.

References

Sites of Special Scientific Interest in Leicestershire
Geological Conservation Review sites